The rufous-tailed antbird (Drymophila genei) is a species of bird in the family Thamnophilidae.

It is endemic to Brazil.

Its natural habitat is subtropical or tropical moist montane forests.

Although generally described as "common", it is becoming rare due to habitat loss.

References

Drymophila
Birds of the Atlantic Forest
Endemic birds of Brazil
Birds described in 1847
Taxa named by Filippo De Filippi
Taxonomy articles created by Polbot